Rally Report was a series of programmes broadcast by the BBC covering the Lombard RAC Rally of Great Britain – then the last round of the World Rally Championship.

It was transmitted on BBC2 from 1984 until 1998 and usually featured previews, a live stage, twice nightly reports and a wrap-up compilation. The show was made at BBC Pebble Mill and later branded as Top Gear Rally Report since unusually it was not made by BBC Sport.  Top Gear presenter William Woollard presented the programme from rally headquarters with Sue Baker, Barrie Gill  and later Tony Mason doing the location reports on the stages.

In 1987 Tony Mason joined Top Gear – first as a rally specialist and then as a major contributor.

The show's theme music was "Jewelled" (from the remix album Wishful Thinking) by Propaganda.

References

Rally racing
Auto racing mass media
Top Gear
BBC Television shows
1980s British sports television series
1990s British sports television series
1984 British television series debuts
1998 British television series endings